Mobiltown is a former station on the Altona railway line, which now forms part of the Werribee railway line in Melbourne, Australia. It was located immediately north of the Kororoit Creek Road level crossing in the suburb of Altona North. The station opened in 1953 as the Standard Oil Platform, next to the oil refinery operated by the Vacuum Oil Company, and was used by refinery workers. Shortly after the company changed its name to Mobil Australia in 1954, the station's name was altered to reflect that. Mobiltown was made a public platform in 1958, and closed on 29 January 1985 because of low patronage. No trace of the platform remains and the rail overpass, which eliminated the Kororoit Creek Road level crossing in 2018, now overshadows the site of the station.

Australian singer-songwriter, Broderick Smith sang about the "Last Train From Mobiltown" on his group's 1981 album Broderick Smith's Big Combo.

References

Disused railway stations in Melbourne
Railway stations in Australia opened in 1953
Railway stations closed in 1985